Linda Olivieri (born 14 July 1998) is an Italian hurdler who competed at the 2019 World Athletics Championships. She competed at the 2020 Summer Olympics, in 400 m hurdles.

Biography
With the standard to participate in the 2019 World Championships in the 400 meters hurdles, set by the IAAF in 56.00, before the start of the championships she reached the 47th in the World Rankings.

Personal best

400 metres hurdles: 55.54 -  Tokyo, 31 July 2021

Achievements

See also
Italian all-time top lists - 400 metres hurdles

References

External links
 

1998 births
Athletics competitors of Fiamme Oro
Italian female hurdlers
World Athletics Championships athletes for Italy
Sportspeople from Turin
Living people
Athletes (track and field) at the 2020 Summer Olympics
Olympic athletes of Italy
20th-century Italian women
21st-century Italian women